Urs Fischer (born 2 May 1973) is a Swiss-born contemporary visual artist living in New York City. Fischer’s practice includes sculpture, installation and photography.

Education and early career
Born to two doctors as the second of two children in 1973, Fischer began his career in Switzerland where he studied photography at the Schule für Gestaltung, Zurich. After the basic, first-year course in art and design, he enrolled in the school's photography department, and supported himself by working as a bouncer at Zurich night clubs and house parties.

Fischer moved to Amsterdam in 1993, at the age of nineteen, and had his first solo show at a gallery in Zurich in 1996. He later lived in London, Los Angeles, and Berlin before moving to New York. In Berlin and New York, he shared studios with fellow artist Rudolf Stingel.

Work

Fischer works across sculpture, photography, drawing, painting and publishing. The artist employs a variety of materials and processes in his work, resulting in an oeuvre that “resists easy classification”. His subversive approach to art is often considered to be influenced by anti-art movements like Neo-Dada, Lost Art, or the Situationist International. Since Fischer began showing his work in Europe in the mid-1990s, he has produced an enormous number of objects, drawings, collages, and room-size installations. Fischer has been described by the arts and culture magazine Vault as “internationally celebrated” and one of the most significant contemporary artists working today.

Individual pieces
In Untitled (Bread House) (2004-2005), Fischer constructed a Swiss style chalet out of loaves of bread. His Bad Timing, Lamb Chop! (2004-2005), displays a giant wooden chair (actually cast aluminium) intersecting a half-empty packet of cigarettes dramatically increased in scale.

Between 2005 and 2006, he created Untitled (Lamp/Bear), an edition of three 23-foot-tall, 20-ton, bronze bears (two are yellow, the third is blue) intersected with generic functional lamps that appear to spring out of their heads; in 2011, one of the pieces was displayed for five months at Seagram Building's plaza before being auctioned at Christie's and is currently displayed at Hamad International Airport in Doha, Qatar. The blue version, affectionately known as "Blueno," was installed at Brown University in Providence, Rhode Island from 2016 to 2020.

For his 2007 show at Gavin Brown's Enterprise in New York, Fischer excavated the gallery's main room, bringing in contractors to dig an eight-foot hole where the floor had been, and calling the result You. The work was described by art critic Jerry Saltz as “experimentally rich, buzzing with energy and entropy, crammed with chaos and contradiction.”

In Death of a Moment (2007), two entire walls are equipped with floor-to-ceiling mirrors and set in motion by a hydraulic system, to create the surreal effect of a room in flux, morphing in shape and size.

In 2010, Fischer released a publication with fellow artist Darren Bader, titled The Bearded Island / The Artists Lament. The publication was a parallel project to the 2009 group exhibition “Remembering Henry’s Show” at the Brant Foundation in Greenwich, Connecticut. The text is a close examination of the fear and obsessions that pervade the life of an artist, set against a series of images.

In 2018, he conceived PLAY, a room-size exhibit combining choreography and sculpture in which audience members can interact with office chairs equipped with motion sensors and motors that move on their own and react to the actions of participants in the gallery.

Fischer’s temporary art wax sculptures have become iconic of the artist’s practice. Fischer began making wax sculptures in the early 2000s, resulting in anonymous and crudely cut female forms. Today, his wax sculptures are refined portraits of significant art world figures that are lit like candles and melted over the duration of an exhibition. The wax works are almost exclusively sculptural portraits of human subjects, and the process of melting lends itself to contemplation of existentialism and the ultimate meaning of art and its legacy.

In 2011, Fischer created a to-scale wax reproduction of The Rape of the Sabine Women by Flemish-Italian sculptor Giambologna for the Venice Biennale. The sculpture was produced at the Swiss foundry, The Kunstgiesserei. Giambologna's original work in the Piazza della Signoria was digitzed using an optical scanner, and the image was used to create a 3D model in polyurethane foam. A negative was made from the foam model, and filled with wax that was pigmented to imitate the effect of marble. A wick system was developed to allow the work, Untitled 2011, to melt like a candle for the duration of the Biennale. The exhibition included another wax sculpture of Fischer’s friend and fellow artist Rudolf Stringel and a wax creation of Fischer’s own office chair. The work was described as a highlight of the Venice Biennale by Vault magazine.

Francesco 2017 is a four-metre tall wax sculpture of the Italian curator Francesco Bonami, a close personal friend of the artist. The National Gallery of Australia acquired Francesco in 2018, the first acquisition under the leadership of new Director Nick Mitzevich. It is the first work of Fischer’s to be accessioned into a collection in the southern hemisphere. 

Francesco 2017 depicts Bonami atop an open refrigerator stacked with fruit and vegetables. The refrigerator acts as a plinth, a satire of sculpture’s elevation of important men on marble plinths. The figure stares at his smartphone, in a position “emblematic of our era”. The melting wax and fruit and vegetables in the fridge are a reference to memento mori of seventeenth-century Dutch painting, where motifs such as food, candles, hourglasses and skulls are utilised as a reminder of mortality. The artist sets no strict parameters for the burning of the sculpture. Wicks are inserted at various locations on the work; all the wicks can be lit at once to accelerate the process or the life of the work can be extended by limiting the number of wicks lit at once. The work can be lit continuously or sporadically. Once the figure has melted completely, the remains will be returned to the Swiss foundry where it was made to be recast and returned to the museum for the next installation.

Mitzevich described the acquisition to The Australian as “[embodying] what this generation of art is about”. In another interview with the Canberra Times, Mitzevich says that the sculpture demonstrates that contemporary art “is not static, it is alive and always changing, reflecting the world in which we live”.

Kiito-San
Fischer has his own publishing imprint, Kiito-San, whose books are distributed by DAP and Buchhandlung Walther König. The imprint has published exhibition catalogues by Fischer as well as books on the work of Spencer Sweeney, Peter Regli, and Darren Bader. In 2015 Kiito-San released a cookbook called Cooking for Artists, written by Mina Stone, who cooks lunch at Fischer's studio.

Fischer's current studio occupies a large warehouse in the Red Hook section of Brooklyn, near the waterfront.

Exhibitions
Fischer’s first  large-scale solo exhibition was Kir Royal in 2004 at the Kunsthaus Zurich in 2004.

Fischer’s first solo exhibition in an American museum was ‘Urs Fischer: Marguerite de Ponty, exhibited across three floors of the New Museum in 2009. The exhibition, curated by the artist, featured “immersive installations and hallucinatory environments." Despite the expansive survey of Fischer’s sculptural and installation works, the exhibition was described as “elegant and breathtakingly spare”, and was well received by critics.

In 2012, the Palazzo Grassi exhibited a retrospective of Fischer’s work, conceived by the artist and curator Caroline Bourgeois. The exhibition was a restaging of the artist’s London studio, and included a survey of models, sketches, notes, furnishings and works of art. Fischer was the first living artist to receive a monographic exhibition at the Palazzo Grassi.

In 2013, MOCA undertook a huge retrospective of Fischer’s work across its two locations, The Geffen Contemporary and MOCA Grand Avenue. This included curation of Fischer’s own works as well as physical interventions in the space such as You 2007, where the artist has cut huge holes out of the museum wall, and an interactive piece Yes 2013 that consisted of many ‘sculptural experiments’ in clay created by visitors to the exhibition. Michelle Kuo, writing for Artforum, described the interventions as a challenge to the “staid and uniform” methods of contemporary curation. Coverage in the Los Angeles times was more critical, commenting that Fischer’s work was largely derivative of artists that came before, such as Robert Gober, Marcel Duchamp and Bruce Nauman; and that the art world satire felt hollow considering that the vast majority of works were loaned from private galleries and collections.

Fischer's installations and sculptures have been exhibited in some group exhibitions and biennales worldwide, including Manifesta 3 and the Venice Biennale in 2003, 2007, and 2011. His solo exhibition at the Kunsthaus Zürich in 2004, titled "Kir Royal," was his first large-scale solo museum exhibition. Recent major exhibitions include "Not My House Not My Fire," Espace 315, Centre Pompidou, Paris (2004); "Mary Poppins," Blaffer Gallery, Art Museum of the University of Houston, Houston, Texas (2006); "Urs Fischer: Marguerite de Ponty," New Museum of Contemporary Art, New York (2009–10); "Skinny Sunrise", Kunsthalle Wien, Vienna (2012); "Madame Fisscher," Palazzo Grassi, Venice (2012); "Urs Fischer," Museum of Contemporary Art, Los Angeles (2013); and "YES," Deste Foundation Project Space, Hydra, Greece (2013); “Play,” Gagosian West 21st Street, New York, 2018, “Maybe,” The Modern Institute, Glasgow (2018); “Dasha,” Gagosian, Davies Street, London (2018); “Big Clay #4 and 2 Tuscan Men,” Piazza della Signoria, Florence (2017); “The Public & the Private,” Legion of Honour Museum, San Francisco (2017); “SIRENS,” Galerie Max Hetzler (2019); and “Images,” Gagosian, Beverly Hills (2019).

In April 2022, Fischer opened his first institutional exhibition in Latin America at the Museo Jumex in Mexico City. New candle works created for the exhibition features artists Spencer Sweeney, Kembra Pfahler, art dealer Esthella Provas, and founder Eugenio López Alonso. The exhibition was curated by Francesco Bonami. He won GNMH AWARD 관념미학어워드(2016)

Art market
At a 2011 Christie’s auction, Jose Mugrabi sold Fischer's Untitled (Lamp/Bear) (2006) for $6 million.

Personal life
Since the early 2000s, Fischer has been residing in a 1920s home in the Solano Canyon neighborhood of Los Angeles.

Fischer was in a relationship with Cassandra MacLeod; in 2009, their daughter Charlotte was born.

In late 2014, Fischer married Tara Subkoff. Subkoff gave birth to a daughter, Grace, in May 2016. In June 2016, it was reported that Subkoff and Fischer had filed for divorce.

References

Bibliography
Adam McEwen, Urs Fischer: Beds and Problem Paintings (New York: Rizzoli), 2012
Caroline Bourgeois, Patricia Falguières, Michele Robecchi, Urs Fischer: Madame Fisscher (New York: Kiito-San), 2012
Bice Curiger, Massimiliano Gioni, Jessica Morgan, Urs Fischer: Shovel in a Hole (Zurich: JRP Ringier), 2009
Garrick Jones, Brice Marden, Beatrix Ruf, Urs Fischer: Good Small Make-Up Tree (Zurich: JRP Ringier), 2005
Bruce Hainley, Jörg Heiser, Mirjam Varadinis, Urs Fischer: Kir Royal (Zurich: JRP Ringier), 2005

Swiss contemporary artists
1973 births
Living people